Naqqareh Kub-e Jadid (also Romanized as Naqqāreh Kūb-e Jadīd and Naqāreh Kūb-e Jadīd) is a village in Qeshlaq Rural District, in the Central District of Ahar County, East Azerbaijan Province, Iran. At the 2006 census, its population was 314, in 61 families.

References 

Populated places in Ahar County